Daehangno (Hangul:대학로 Hanja:, lit. "college street") is a neighborhood in Seoul north of the Han River within Jongno-gu and Seodaemun-gu.

Formerly known as Sunggyobang (Hangul:숭교방 Hanja:), meaning "high respect for teaching", its current name was designated when the 1.1 km six-lane road from Hyehwa-dong (혜화동) rotary to Ihwadong (이화동 ) crossroad was designated as a "street of culture" on May 5, 1985.

Overview

Daehangno is the street from the crossroad of 79–1, Jongno 5-ga, Jongno-gu, to Hyehwadong rotary, 132, Hyehwa-dong. Its name was designated on May 5, 1985, when the street was designated as the “street of culture” representing the characteristics of this area. At the beginning, the section of 700m between Naksan Garden on Hyehwadong side and the Attached Middle School, College of Education, Seoul National University, was designated as a “street without cars” during 18:00 - 22:00 on Saturdays and 12:00 - 22:00 on Sundays and holidays. Daehangno was originally the road of 3.1 km in length from Jangchung Park, 187, Jangchung-dong, to Ssangnim-dong and Ihwa-dong. But, when deciding the name of the street on November 7, 1984, the section between the crossroad of Jongno 5-ga and Jangchung Park was separated from Daehangno as Hunlyeonwon road by the subdivision policy of downtown section. It was originally 25m in width, but expanded to 40m from Ihwadong crossroad to Hyehwadong rotary, owing to the construction of the Seoul Subway Line 4.

This was an area where college students and the youth used to gather as College of Chemistry and College of Law, Seoul National University. But, when Seoul National University moved near Gwanaksan in 1975, Marronnier Park was formed in the area, and many cultural art organizations related to plays, movies, concerts and musicals moved in. Street artists can freely express themselves at Marronnier Park.

Outdoor performance stages and playing grounds located on the road plaza in front of the Korean Culture and Arts Foundation attract the young generation for outdoor concerts, poem recitations, plays and the like.

Major passage areas are Myeongnyun-dong, Yeonji-dong, Hyoje-dong, Ihwa-dong, Dongsung-dong and Yeongeon-dong in Jongno-gu. Daehangno is connected to Changgyeonggungno, Dongsomunno and Jongno, and a convenient place with Hyehwa station of the subway line No 4 and Jongno 5-ga station of Seoul Subway Line 4.

Cultural art organizations such as the Artistic and Cultural Foundation of Korea, the Korean Culture and Arts Foundation, Dongsoong Art Gallery, Art Hall, Samtoh's Blue Bird Theater, Daehangno Theater, Marronnier's Small Theater and Grand Theater of the Literary Hall, including educational institutes such as the Attached Elementary School and Middle School of the College of Education, Seoul National University, Korea National Open University and Hyoje Elementary School, and public institutions such as Hyoje Tax Office, Korea International Cooperation Agency, National Institute for International Education Development, Jungbu District Office of Education and Hyehwa Telephone Office, are all located in this area.

In addition, Heungsadahn, Korea Institute of Design Promotion, Eehwa Wedding Hall, Memorial Hall for 100th anniversary of the Korean Christianity, Christianity Hall and Catholic Youth Hall, and Eehwajang, the remains of the Joseon Dynasty and historical monument No 6 of Seoul, are all located in this area.
Also, recently the SunggyunKwan University dormitory was built in the area.

History

King Taejo relocated Sungkyunkwan to the current location, Daehangno, after the founding of the Joseon Dynasty. It gave the former name "Sunggyobang" (Hangul:숭교방 Hanja:), meaning "high respect for teaching".

When Korea was under Japanese rules, Keijō Imperial University was founded in this area. The university was later merged with other colleges into Seoul National University.

After Seoul National University was moved near to the Gwanaksan in 1975, Marronnier Park were formed. Moving of Seoul National University led the opening of the Art Gallery and Art Theater of the Literary Hall and development of cultural space by Kim Swoo Geun in the same area.

Operation of the city plan attracted the moving population on Daehangno being increased gradually.

Tourism
Designation of the name Daehangno, and management and discontinuance of the “street without cars” brought an increase in the number of small theater (establishment of 13 small theaters) and degenerated cultural space for the youth, which was a valuable space for the young culture.

Marronnier Park was activated as the renovation work for street environment was pursued, and small theaters were getting crowded so as to attract the increase of the appearance of commercial drama. Near Daehangno is Naksan Park, also. All these movements are for the space of performing culture.

External links
Daehangno– Seoul’s Theater District: Official Seoul City Tourism
Daehakno (University Avenue) Article
Jongno-gu local government website
Tour2Korea
Article by Seoul City Government
Daehangno videoclip

Neighbourhoods of Jongno-gu
Streets in Seoul
Neighbourhoods of Seodaemun District
Entertainment districts in South Korea
Tourist attractions in Seoul